Tony Pep (born September 14, 1964) is a former professional boxer from New Westminster, British Columbia. He has a record of 42 wins (22 of which were by knockout), 10 losses, and 1 draw.

Boxing career 
During his career, Pep held the Commonwealth super featherweight title, the IBO lightweight title and the Canadian lightweight and featherweight titles. He made an unsuccessful bid for the WBO super featherweight title, losing a 12-round unanimous decision to Regilio Tuur on March 9, 1995. On June 14, 1998, Tony Pep fought Floyd Mayweather and lost by unanimous decision.

Professional boxing record

External links
Tony Pep
 

1964 births
Living people
Sportspeople from New Westminster
Canadian male boxers
Light-welterweight boxers